Squash, for the 2013 Island Games, took place at the Bermuda Squash Racquets Association in Devonshire Parish, Bermuda. The competition took place from 14 to 19 July 2013.

Medal table
 Bermuda 2013 Squash Medal Tally

Medal summary of events

References

2013 Island Games
2013 in squash
2013